Cándido Salazar (1898 – death date unknown) was a Cuban pitcher in the Negro leagues in the 1920s.

A native of Camagüey, Cuba, Salazar played for the Cuban Stars (West) in 1924. In 14 recorded games on the mound, he posted a 6.94 ERA over 70 innings.

References

External links
 and Seamheads

1898 births
Date of birth missing
Year of death missing
Place of death missing
Cuban Stars (West) players
Cuban baseball players
Baseball pitchers
Sportspeople from Camagüey